Prince Tsunenaga, one of the sons of Japanese Emperor Go-Daigo
 11514 Tsunenaga, a minor planet
 Hasekura Tsunenaga, a Japanese samurai and retainer of Date Masamune, the daimyō of Sendai of Japanese imperial descent with ancestral ties to Emperor Kanmu